The 2022–23 FC Ingolstadt 04 season is the club's first season back in the 3. Liga since their promotion in the 2020–21 season.

FC Ingolstadt were relegated from the 2021–22 2. Bundesliga, and return to the 3. Liga after a one-year absence.

Transfers

In

Out

Squad

Competitions

Friendlies

3. Liga

Table

Results

Bavarian Cup

DFB-Pokal

References 

FC Ingolstadt 04 seasons
Football in Germany